Nigeria participated at the 2015 All-Africa Games held in Brazzaville, Republic of the Congo. It participated with 573 athletes in 21 sports. Nigeria finished 2nd in the 2015 All-Africa Games medal table.

Athletics
The following athletes competed for Nigeria in athletics and reached the finals.

Badminton
The Nigerian National Badminton Team placed third, losing 0–3 to Mauritius in the Semifinal.

The following athletes/teams medaled for Nigeria.

Basketball
The Men's team placed third after losing 60–61 to Egypt, and then beating Mali 57–55 in the third place match. The Women's team placed second after losing 57–73 to Mali in the final.

Beach volleyball
The women's team beat South Africa 2–1 in the Final to claim gold.

Boxing

Cycling
The following athletes placed top ten in cycling for Nigeria.

Football 
The men's team placed third after beating Congo in the 3rd place match. The game tied 0-0, and Nigeria won 5–3 in the penalty kick shootout. The woman's team placed 4th, losing the 3rd place match to Ivory Coast 1–2.

Fencing

Gymnastics

Judo

Karate

Petanque

Swimming

Table tennis

Taekwondo

Tennis

Volleyball

Weightlifting

Wrestling

References

Nations at the 2015 African Games
2015